Melvin Floyd Sembler (born May 10, 1930) is an American former diplomat who was the United States Ambassador to Italy (2001–2005), and Ambassador to Australia and Nauru (1989–1993). He has also served as chairman of the board of the Sembler Company, which develops and manages shopping centers, and co-founder of Straight, Inc., a controversial drug-treatment center. Sembler is the chairman of the Scooter Libby Legal Defense Trust, and was a co-chair of the Florida Finance Committee for Mitt Romney.

Early life and education
Sembler was born on May 10, 1930 in St. Joseph, Missouri, and earned a Bachelor of Science degree from Northwestern University in 1952. He is of Jewish descent.

Political fund raising career
Sembler has been a Republican fundraiser since 1979, raising a record $21.3 million at a single dinner in April 2000. During the 1988 Presidential campaign, Sembler served on the National Steering Committee and the National Finance Committee for the George H. W. Bush for President campaign. Additionally, he was finance co-chairman for the state of Florida for the George Bush for President campaign. He served on President Reagan's White House Conference for a Drug-Free America and was an advisor on drug policy to President Bush and to Florida's former governor Bob Martinez. He served as co-chairman of the Republican National Committee's Team 100 and finance co-chairman of the American Bicentennial Presidential Inaugural, and from 1993 to 1995 he was finance chairman of the Republican Party of Florida.

Sembler served as finance chairman for the Republican National Committee from 1997 to 2000, as Florida's National Committeeman to the Republican National Committee from 1994 to 2000, as honorary chairman of the Republican Jewish Coalition, as chairman of the Drug Free America Foundation, served on the boards of the Florida Governor's Mansion Foundation, and the Florida Holocaust Museum. He is a resident member of the Florida Council of 100, a business advisory council to the governor of Florida. Sembler serves on the boards of the International Council of Shopping Centers, Freedom's Watch, the American Enterprise Institute, American-Australian Education Leadership Foundation, George Bush Presidential Library Foundation, American Momentum Bank and the Moffitt Cancer Center.

Sembler was a supporter of the presidential candidacy of Mitt Romney and is one of the more prominent Jewish donors to the Republican party. On October 11, 2011, Republican presidential hopeful Mitt Romney announced that he had appointed Sembler to his Florida Finance Team.

Sembler is a vocal opponent of medical marijuana. On 26 April 2016, he pledged to begin a fundraising drive to defeat the proposed constitutional amendment in Florida that would legalize medical marijuana. Orlando attorney and major democratic donor John Morgan challenged Sembler through Twitter to match his own $7 million contribution in support of the amendment, calling Sembler "Mel the Moocher."

Financial career
Sembler has served on the Board of Directors of several banks, including the First Bank of Treasure Island, the National Bank, First Union Bank, and presently serves on the Board of Directors of American Momentum Bank. He founded the Sembler Company, a shopping center development and management firm, and served as the spokesman for the shopping career industry as the 1986-1987 President of the International Council of Shopping Centers, where he served for 25 years.

The Sembler Company came to the attention of federal investigators in 2008 after a planned shopping center in Boynton Beach, Florida, that had previously been denied a zoning variance, was suddenly approved after a payment of $100,000 had been made to lobbyist Hugo Unruh. Unruh's name had previously "popped up" in a corruption investigation that led to the conviction of two Palm Beach county commissioners in 2006.

Diplomatic career
In February 1989, President George H. W. Bush appointed Sembler United States Ambassador to Australia and Nauru, where he served for three and a half years. On August 23, 1989, cartoonist Garry Trudeau published a Doonesbury comic strip which seemed to imply that Sembler had purchased the ambassadorship. It has been pointed out that Sembler had no previous diplomatic experience and had donated $100,000 to the presidential campaign of George H. W. Bush shortly before his appointment. During his tenure as ambassador, however, his performance "won favorable reviews and quieted his critics". At the recommendation of the Governor-General of Australia and with the approval of Queen Elizabeth II, Sembler was named an Honorary Officer of the Order of Australia at an investiture ceremony in October 2000, recognising achievement or meritorious service to Australia or humanity at large.

Sembler was appointed U.S. Ambassador to Italy by President George W. Bush, being sworn in on 16 November 2001. In February 2005 Sembler had an annex to the U.S. Embassy in Rome named after him (the Mel Sembler Building), an honour never before bestowed on a sitting diplomat, and made possible due to an amendment by Congressman Bill Young to an appropriations bill. President George W. Bush appointed Sembler to serve on the Honorary Delegation to accompany him to Jerusalem for the celebration of the 60th anniversary of the State of Israel in May 2008. He received the America Award from the Italy-USA Foundation in 2014.

Straight, Incorporated

In 1976, Sembler and his wife, Betty, founded Straight, Incorporated, an adolescent drug treatment program which has treated more than 12,000 young people who were labeled as addicts. The group now operates as the Drug Free America Foundation.

In May 1983, Straight, Inc was convicted of false imprisonment after being sued by then 20-year-old Fred Collins Jr., who alleged he had been held captive by the program against his will. The program was ordered to pay $40,000 in compensatory and $180,000 in punitive damages. In 1990, a jury awarded Karen Norton $721,000 in damages due to mistreatment by Straight. In 1982, while a patient in Straight's Florida facility, Norton alleged that staff members assaulted her, and denied her health care.

It has been suggested that licensing for Straight's Florida-based programs had been renewed under pressure from Sembler on state senators. Sembler's Drug Free America Foundation continues to campaign for hard-line drug policy. Former Governor Jeb Bush of Florida, the brother of President George W. Bush, former Drug Enforcement Administration Administrator Karen Tandy, and Congressman Dan Lungren of California are on the advisory board.

Personal history
Sembler and his wife Betty were married in 1953. They had three sons, Steve, Brent, and Greg plus eleven grandchildren. Betty died on February 16, 2022.

References

External links
 United States Department of State profile
 Sembler Company bio of Mel Sembler
 

1930 births
Living people
People from St. Joseph, Missouri
20th-century American Jews
Ambassadors of the United States to Australia
Ambassadors of the United States to Italy
Florida Republicans
Northwestern University alumni
Honorary Officers of the Order of Australia
21st-century American Jews
20th-century American diplomats
21st-century American diplomats